The United States Senate election of 1940 in New York was held on November 5, 1940. Incumbent Democratic Senator James M. Mead, first elected in 1938 to fill vacancy caused by the death of Royal S. Copeland, was re-elected to a full term in office, defeating Republican Bruce Barton.

Republican nomination

Candidates
Bruce Barton, U.S. Representative from Manhattan

Convention
At the Republican convention in White Plains on September 27, Bruce Barton was nominated without opposition. His nomination came at the urging of presidential candidate Wendell Willkie. He focused his acceptance speech on the need to deny President Roosevelt an unprecedented third term in office, which he insinuated would lead to dictatorship through an end to free elections, end of labor unionism, the end of Congress and Congress's power to declare war, the end of protection for racial and religious minorities, and the establishment of a permanent conscripted peacetime army "á la Hitler and Mussolini."

Democratic nomination

Candidates
James M. Mead, incumbent Senator since 1938

Convention
Without a declared opponent, Senator Mead was assured re-nomination. At the state convention at the Manhattan Center on September 30, Mead gave a speech praising President Roosevelt, James A. Farley, Edward J. Flynn, Senator Robert F. Wagner, and Governor Herbert Lehman. He fully embraced Roosevelt's bid for a third term, arguing that the Founding Fathers had not intended any limit on the term of president, and argued for religious tolerance and national unity. His nomination was confirmed unanimously in a night session of the convention.

General election

Candidates
 Bruce Barton, U.S. Representative from Manhattan (Republican)
 James M. Mead, incumbent Senator since 1938 (Democratic)
 Stephen W. Paine (Prohibition)

Results

References

United States Senate elections in New York (state)
New York (state)
United States Senate